Tom Morton-Smith (born 1980) is an English playwright.

Biography
Morton-Smith studied Drama at the University of East Anglia before training as an actor at the London Academy of Music and Dramatic Art.

In 2006 he was selected to be part of Future Perfect, a writer's group attached to Paines Plough theatre company. In 2007 he joined the company as their playwright-in-residence.

His debut stage play, Salt Meets Wound, premiered at Theatre503 in May 2007.

His play Oppenheimer, about the physicist J Robert Oppenheimer and the building of the atomic bomb, was performed by the Royal Shakespeare Company in 2015 in the Swan Theatre, Stratford-upon-Avon, until it transferred to London's West End in April 2015. The play was nominated for Best New Play at the 2016 WhatsOnStage Awards.

In April 2022 it was announced that he would adapt Studio Ghibli's 1988 animated film My Neighbour Totoro for the stage. Produced by the Royal Shakespeare Company and the film's original composer Joe Hisaishi, the play ran for a fifteen week limited season at the Barbican Theatre, London, from October 2022. The play won five categories at the 2023 WhatsOnStage Awards, having been nominated in nine. It was also nominated in nine categories for the 2023 Laurence Olivier Awards, including Best Entertainment or Comedy Play.

Works

Plays 

 Salt Meets Wound (2007) (premiered at Theatre503)
 Everyday Maps for Everyday Use (2012) (premiered at the Finborough Theatre, London)
 In Doggerland (2013) (premiered at the Lowry, Manchester)
 Oppenheimer (2015) (premiered at the Swan Theatre, Stratford-upon-Avon, then transferring to the Vaudeville Theatre)
 The Earthworks (2017) (premiered at The Other Place, Stratford-upon-Avon)
 Ravens: Spassky vs. Fischer (2019) (premiered at the Hampstead Theatre)
 My Neighbour Totoro (2022) (based on the Studio Ghibli film of the same name, premiered at the Barbican)

References

External links
Author's website

Alumni of the University of East Anglia
Alumni of the London Academy of Music and Dramatic Art
Living people
1980 births
English dramatists and playwrights